NoNoNo (stylised as NONONO) is a Swedish indie rock band formed in 2012. Their debut single, "Pumpin Blood", has charted in Europe and the US, peaking at number 22 on the Billboard Alternative Songs chart and at number 32 on the Pop Songs chart, among others. The single sold 700,000 copies worldwide.

Discography

Studio albums

EPs

Singles

Notes

References

External links
 
 
 Michel Rocwell on Discogs
 Astma & Rocwell on Discogs

Musical groups established in 2012
Swedish musical trios
English-language singers from Sweden
2012 establishments in Sweden
Musical groups from Stockholm